The ZIL-111 was a limousine produced by the Soviet car manufacturer ZIL in 1958–1967. It was the first post-war limousine designed in the Soviet Union. After tests with the shortlived prototype ZIL-Moscow in 1956, which gained a place in the Guinness Book of Records as the largest passenger car in the world, the ZIL-111 was introduced from ZIL in 1958. The body style was in the American tradition of the time and resembled the mid-1950s cars built by Packard, although, apart from being in tune with current trends, it was an original design and had nothing in common with them, except in general layout. The interiors were trimmed with top quality leather and broadcloth and decorated with thick pile carpet and polished wooden fittings. It featured a comprehensive ventilation and heating system and a 5-band radio, all of which could be controlled from the rear, electric windows, vacuum-operated screen wash, windshield and front door window defrosting. The car won a top prize at the Brussels Expo World Fair in 1958.

Apart from a basic version ZIL-111, the manufacturer produced ZIL-111A with air conditioning, which had a smaller and flatter rear window due to air tubes, and the convertible ZIL-111V (ЗИЛ-111В in Russian), of which only 12 were built.

In December 1962 the car was completely restyled, now being in tune with the latest trends and having a wide chrome grille with quad headlamps similar to the one used on the 1961 Cadillac Fleetwood Seventy-Five, and was available both as sedan ZIL-111G and convertible ZIL-111D. It was fitted with a 200 hp  V8. For U.S. President Dwight D. Eisenhower's visit, Yevgeny Molchanov designed a special version of this car. Air conditioning was standard. The ZIL-111G went out of production in 1966. The first ZIL-111D was built in 1963, six months after the new ZIL-111 appeared; only about eight were built, half with grey exteriors, and all were fitted with microphones. Fidel Castro received a ZIL-111D as a gift.

As a rule, the ZIL-111 was available only as state-owned transport for members of the Politburo. In 1958-1967 112 of all models were made, of them 26 ZIL-111Gs.

A minibus based on the ZIL-111, the ZIL-118 Yunost (Youth), was also developed and produced in small numbers. 

The ZIL-111 would be replaced in 1967 by the ZIL-114.

Variants
ZIL-111: Original production version.
ZIL-111A: ZIL-111 with air conditioning.
ZIL-111V: Convertible version.
ZIL-111G: Modernized ZIL-111.
ZIL-111D: Convertible version.

References

Cars of Russia
Luxury vehicles
111
Soviet automobiles
Cars introduced in 1958
1960s cars